Volturara may refer to:

Volturara Appula, Italian municipality of the province of Foggia
Volturara Irpina, Italian municipality of the province of Avellino

See also
Vulturaria (titular see)